Hendrik Johannes "Henno" Jordaan (born 16 October 1988) is a South African cricketer who now plays for the Thailand national cricket team. He is a right-handed batsman and right-arm medium pace bowler and played in 2 first-class matches and 5 List A matches for Boland cricket team between 2009 and 2012.

In June 2019, he was named in the Thailand's squad for the 2019 Malaysia Tri-Nation Series tournament. He made his Twenty20 International (T20I) debut for Thailand, against Malaysia, on 24 June 2019.

References

External links
 

1988 births
Living people
Cricketers from Pretoria
South African cricketers
Thai cricketers
Henno Jordaan
Boland cricketers